Fort Pitt was a fort built by British forces between 1759 and 1761 during the French and Indian War at the confluence of the Monongahela and Allegheny rivers, where the Ohio River is formed in western Pennsylvania (modern day Pittsburgh). It was near (but not directly on) the site of Fort Duquesne, a French colonial fort built in 1754 as tensions increased between Great Britain and France in both Europe and North America. The French destroyed Fort Duquesne in 1758 when they retreated under British attack.

British colonial protection of this area ultimately led to the development of Pittsburgh and Allegheny County, Pennsylvania by British-American colonists and immigrants.

Location and construction

In April 1754, the French began building Fort Duquesne on the site of the small British Fort Prince George at the beginning of the French and Indian War (AKA Seven Years' War). The Braddock expedition, a 1755 British attempt to take Fort Duquesne, met with defeat at the Battle of the Monongahela at present-day Braddock, Pennsylvania. The French garrison later defeated an attacking British regiment in September 1758 at the Battle of Fort Duquesne. French Colonel de Lignery ordered Fort Duquesne destroyed and abandoned at the approach of General John Forbes' expedition in late November.

A number of factors contributed to this strategic withdrawal. In August of 1758 the French Fort Frontenac, at the head of Lake Ontario, was captured by British Gen. Bradstreet, severing the supply lines to French fortifications across the frontier. Fort Duquesne was the southernmost of these. Short on materiel, French commander François-Marie Le Marchand de Lignery was forced to dismiss elements under his command down the Ohio River to their bases in Illinois and Louisiana, and send others overland north to Ft. Presque Isle. Those Native who may have remained at Fort Duquesne were likely eager to return to their winter longhouses before the weather changed. Consequently, the fort was further undermanned, possibly left with as few as 200 regulars.

The late October Treaty of Easton with several Native tribes involved in the war largely dissolved the alliance that had enabled French military dominance in the region. Chiefs of 13 American Indian nations agreed to negotiate peace with the colonial governments of Pennsylvania and New Jersey and to abandon any alliances with the French. The nations were primarily the Six Nations of the Iroquois League, bands of the Lenape (Delaware), and the Shawnee. They agreed to the treaty based on the colonial governments' promising to respect their rights to hunting and territory in the Ohio Country, to prohibit establishing new settlements west of the Appalachian Mountains, and to withdraw British and colonial military troops after the war.

The French commander, anticipating an attack along Braddock’s road, had spent some effort fortifying positions there. (Forbes had several times advanced men along that route as a feint.) From prisoners captured during Maj. James Grant’s catastrophic attack on Fort Duquesne, de Lignery was reportedly surprised to learn of a fortified encampment of British troops only 50 miles away at Ligonier, Pennsylvania, with substantial reserves behind. He was also certainly cognizant of the British lightning raid on the Native village of Kittanning (40 miles north on the Allegheny River) two years earlier. Thus, a British attack from the north was a distinct possibility. Forbes had indeed contemplated an attack further north on Fort Machault (later, Ft. Venango; modern-day Franklin, PA.)

Finding himself in an under-manned, flood-prone fort in a weak defensive position, vulnerable to attack from three directions, and running low on provisions, de Lignery retreated north. He destroyed the stores and many of the structures as 1500 advance British troops under the command of Forbes drew within 10 miles. The French never returned to the region.

The British built a new fort and named it Fort Pitt, after William Pitt the Elder. The fort was built from 1759 to 1761 during the French and Indian War (Seven Years' War), next to the site of former Fort Duquesne. It was built in the popular pentagram shape, with bastions at the star points, by Captain Harry Gordon, a British Engineer in the 60th Royal American Regiment.

Pontiac's War

After the colonial war and in the face of continued broken treaties, broken promises and encroachment by the Europeans, in 1763 the western Lenape and Shawnee took part in a Native uprising known as Pontiac's War, an effort to drive settlers out of the Native American territory. The American Indians' siege of Fort Pitt began on June 22, 1763, but they found it too well-fortified to be taken by force. In negotiations during the siege, Captain Simeon Ecuyer, a Swiss mercenary and the commander of Fort Pitt, gave two Delaware emissaries blankets that had been exposed to smallpox. The potential of this act to cause an epidemic among the American Indians was clearly understood. Commander William Trent wrote that he hoped "it will have the desired effect." Colonel Henry Bouquet, leading a relief force, would discuss similar tactics with Commander-in-Chief Jeffery Amherst. The effectiveness of these attempts to spread the disease are unknown, although it is known that the method used is inefficient compared to respiratory transmission, and it is difficult to differentiate from naturally occurring epidemics resulting from previous contacts with colonists.

During and after Pontiac's War, epidemics of smallpox among Native Americans devastated the tribes of Ohio Valley and the Great Lakes areas. On August 1, 1763, most of the American Indians broke off the siege to intercept the approaching force under Colonel Bouquet. In the Battle of Bushy Run, Bouquet fought off the American Indian attack and relieved Fort Pitt on August 10.

In 1772, after Pontiac's War, the British commander at Fort Pitt sold the building to two colonists, William Thompson and Alexander Ross. At that time, the Pittsburgh area was claimed by the colonies of both Virginia and Pennsylvania, which struggled for power over the region.  After Virginians took control of Fort Pitt, they called it Fort Dunmore, in honour of Virginia's Governor Lord Dunmore. The fort served as a staging ground in Dunmore's War of 1774.

American Revolutionary War
During the American Revolutionary War, Fort Pitt served as a headquarters for the western theatre of the war. In 1778, Sampson Mathews, George Clymer, and Samuel Washington were sent as representatives for the United States Congress to the western frontier to report on security of the American border. Congress had learned of British governor Henry Hamilton's efforts to pit local Indian tribes against the lightly guarded American western border, and feared attack. From Fort Pitt, the committee reported back to Congress the seriousness of the threat, leading Congress to send 3,000 militiamen to the western frontier, including George Rogers Clark. Clark finally captured Hamilton in winter 1779—a success that encouraged the alliance with France.

In present-day Michigan, the British garrisoned Fort Detroit.

A redoubt, a small brick outbuilding called the Blockhouse, survives in Point State Park as the sole remnant of Fort Pitt. Erected in 1764, it is believed to be the oldest building still standing in Pittsburgh. Used for many years as a private residence, the blockhouse was purchased and preserved for many years by the local chapter of the Daughters of the American Revolution.

Later history

Notice was given to area residents of an auction of all salvageable remains of the fort on August 3, 1797 after the U.S. Army decommissioned the site.

In the 20th century, the city of Pittsburgh commissioned archeological excavation of the foundations of Fort Pitt. Afterward, some of the fort was reconstructed to give visitors at Point State Park a sense of the size of the fort. In this rebuilt section, the Fort Pitt Museum is housed in the Monongahela Bastion, and excavated portions of the fort were filled in.

Fort Pitt Foundry was an important armaments manufacturing center for the Federal government during the Civil War, under the charge of William Metcalf.

Popular culture
The Allegheny Uprising (1939) starred John Wayne and Claire Trevor.
In Cecil B. DeMille's Unconquered (1947), starring Gary Cooper and Paulette Goddard, Howard Da Silva played a gunrunner and Boris Karloff a Seneca chief who lead an American Indian uprising in 1763. Cooper and Goddard save Fort Pitt.
The video game Assassin's Creed III (2012) features Fort Pitt, but it is referred to as "Fort Duquesne", although some of the action takes place after the Braddock and Forbes expeditions, when Pitt had been built to replace Duquesne.
Conrad Richter's youth novel, The Light in the Forest (1953), is partially set at Fort Pitt.
 Aerials of the fort can be seen during the opening credits of the film “Groundhog Day” as the live truck leaves the downtown area on its way to Punxsutawney.

See also
 Great Britain in the Seven Years' War
 Fort Dunmore, a later fort on the same site
 Fort Fayette, a later fort by Gen. Anthony Wayne on the same site

References

Further reading
O'Meara, Walter. Guns at the Forks. Pittsburgh, PA: University of Pittsburgh Press, 1965. .
Stotz, Charles Morse. Outposts Of The War For Empire: The French And English In Western Pennsylvania: Their Armies, Their Forts, Their People 1749-1764. Pittsburgh: University of Pittsburgh Press, 2005. .
Durant, Samuel W., plate IV, History of Allegheny Co., Pennsylvania : with illustrations descriptive of its scenery, palatial residences, public buildings, fine blocks, and important manufactories, Philadelphia: L. H. Everts, 1876.

External links

Fort Pitt Museum and Bushy Run Battlefield
360° panorama of the Blockhouse exterior
360° panorama of the Blockhouse interior

Pitt
Pitt
Pitt
Pontiac's War
Pitt
History of Pittsburgh
Pitt
Government buildings completed in 1761
Infrastructure completed in 1761
1761 establishments in Pennsylvania